"Genom eld och vatten" is a song written by Stina Jadelius and Mårten Eriksson, and performed by Sarek at Melodifestivalen 2003, where it ended up 6th. On 30 March 2003, the song entered Svensktoppen, where it first ended up fourth, and peaked at second position on 6 April 2003. On 12 October 2003, the song was knocked out of chart. The song was also released as a single. In 2021, a cover by Dolores peaked at number two on Sverigetopplistan's Heatseeker chart.

Charts

Weekly charts

Year-end charts

References 

2003 singles
Melodifestivalen songs of 2003
Swedish-language songs
2003 songs
Songs written by Mårten Eriksson